Cristo Rey Kansas City High School is a Roman Catholic high school founded by the Sisters of Charity of Leavenworth in 2006 as a part of the Cristo Rey Network of schools. It is located in Kansas City, Missouri, in the Roman Catholic Diocese of Kansas City-Saint Joseph.

Background
In 2010, Cristo Rey graduated its first class. In that year and in subsequent years, 100% of its graduates were accepted to college.

Annually, the school hosts its own version of a "Dancing with the Stars" fundraiser, the event includes community leaders as celebrity stars.  In 2012 students and faculty received a donation of 400 iPads. In 2013 and in 2016, Cristo Rey students were selected for the national Horatio Alger Scholar program, which honors outstanding students who have overcome early obstacles to their education.

Activities 
All students are offered  retreat experience each year, and in senior year the three-day Kairos retreat.

The voluntary service requirement for all students is 20 hours each year. A special feature of the school's service program is its annual Community Service Day. The school also hosts university students doing voluntary service projects.

The following clubs are active at the school: Art Club, Cheerleading, Drum Line, FIRST Robotics Competition, Interact of Rotary International, National Hispanic Honor Society, National Honor Society, No Place For Hate, Peer Counselors, Student Ambassadors, and Student Council. A popular extracurricular is being one of the CRKC Student Dancers and a part of their hip hop performance.

The school is a member of the Missouri State High School Activities Association and fields boys' and girls' teams in cross country, soccer, and basketball, track and field, along with boys' baseball and girls' volleyball.

References

Further reading
 Kearney, G. R. More Than a Dream: The Cristo Rey Story: How One School's Vision Is Changing the World. Chicago, Ill: Loyola Press, 2008.

External links
 School Website

Roman Catholic Diocese of Kansas City–Saint Joseph
High schools in Kansas City, Missouri
Poverty-related organizations
Catholic secondary schools in Missouri
Educational institutions established in 2006
Cristo Rey Network
2006 establishments in Missouri